The Baedalwang was a Go competition.

Outline
The Baedalwang was decided in a best-of-5 match where each player had 3 hours to think. The komi was 6.5. This tournament ran from 1993 to 2000.

Winners & runners-up

Go competitions in South Korea